Hogar TV is an Arabic language satellite television channel broadcasting from hydra. Hogar TV was set up by an Algerian businessman Mohammed Mouloudi with a number of Arab intellectuals from Algeria and the Arab World.

History
Hogar TV was founded in May 2012, it has started to broadcast its programs in May 2012.

Programming 
 Eon Kid

References

External links
 Official Page on facebook

Arab mass media
Television in Algeria
Arabic-language television stations
Arabic-language television
Television channels and stations established in 2012
Television stations in Algeria
Television channels and stations disestablished in 2015